Joseph Patrick O'Sullivan (March 3, 1944 – July 2, 2022), known professionally as Spider Webb after the character from the 1937 serial film Tim Tyler's Luck, was an American tattoo artist.

Biography 
He was born in The Bronx, New York, the son of Tecla Baranowicz and David O'Sullivan. At the age of fourteen, O'Sullivan had visited a tattoo artist in Coney Island, New York for which he got his first tattoo on his arm. He learned about tattooing for which he had pursuit. O'Sullivan served in the United States Navy from 1962 to 1966. He also attended the School of Visual Arts, where he earned his bachelor's degree in 1970. He then emigrated to Mexico to attend Instituto Allende, where he earned his master's degree.

O'Sullivan served as a tattoo artist in Mount Vernon, New York for which he had established a tattoo parlor store. In 1976, O'Sullivan was a part of a protest of tattooing being banned by New York for which according to the Courier-Post, he had shown his work somewhere near the Museum of Modern Art. He had stated that "Tattooing is perfectly safe". In 1978, O'Sullivan was arrested for tattooing without a license. In 1981, he had shown his work again from 1976 for which pornographic actress and sex educator Annie Sprinkle had taken part in what he was doing. O'Sullivan had a legal case about his tattooing work for which New York had let go of the prohibity. He was also an author of two books.

O'Sullivan died in July 2022 of chronic obstructive pulmonary disease at his home in Asheville, North Carolina, at the age of 78.

References 

1944 births
2022 deaths
Writers from the Bronx
Military personnel from New York City
Deaths from chronic obstructive pulmonary disease
American tattoo artists
American male writers
20th-century American people
21st-century American people
20th-century American male writers
School of Visual Arts alumni
Instituto Allende alumni
American emigrants to Mexico